Edgar S. Woolard Jr. (born 1934) is an American businessman. He was chairman and chief executive officer of DuPont from 1989 to 1995.

Early life
Edgar Woolard was born on April 15, 1934, in Washington, North Carolina. He received a Bachelor of Science degree in industrial engineering from North Carolina State University in 1956. He was a lieutenant in the United States Armed Forces.

Career
In 1957, he joined DuPont as an industrial engineer in the Kinston, North Carolina plant, moving on to manufacturing and management positions in Wilmington, Delaware, Old Hickory, Tennessee and Camden, South Carolina. He was CEO and chairman from 1989 to 1995. During that time, DuPont stock increased by 160 percent.

He joined the board of directors of Telex Communications in 1998, and was its chairman from March 2000 to November 2003. He has been on the board of directors of the New York Stock Exchange, Citigroup, Apple Inc., IBM and Bell Atlantic. He has also been an advisor to Acorn Energy since January 2010. He is a member of the North Carolina Textile Foundation. He was chairman of The Business Council from 1995 to 1996. He is a member of the Bretton Woods Committee.

Philanthropy
He is a member of the National Academy of Engineering and the American Philosophical Society. In 1988, he received the Distinguished Engineering Alumnus Award Recipient from his alma mater, NCSU. He has donated more than US$1 million to the John T. Caldwell Alumni Scholarships at NCSU. The Edgar S. Woolard Chair at the University of Delaware is named after him.

Personal life
He is married to Peggy Harrell, and they have two daughters, Annette and Lynda. He lives in Wilmington, Delaware, Jupiter, Florida, and Palm Beach Gardens, Florida.

References

Living people
1934 births
North Carolina State University alumni
DuPont people
New York Stock Exchange people
Citigroup people
Directors of Apple Inc.
Members of the United States National Academy of Engineering
People from Palm Beach Gardens, Florida
People from Washington, North Carolina
People from Wilmington, Delaware
People from Jupiter, Florida